Rowan Halt railway station, was a railway station in Hove, in East Sussex, England which opened in 1933 and closed on 1 January 1939; the layout and curvature of Rowan Avenue indicates where the branch ran.

Location
The station served the Aldrington Estate (then being built by T. J. Braybon & Sons Ltd), and "enabled residents working in Brighton or Hove to return home for their cooked meal at lunchtime".

References 

Disused railway stations in Brighton and Hove
Former Southern Railway (UK) stations
Railway stations in Great Britain opened in 1933
Railway stations in Great Britain closed in 1939